The Foundation University Islamabad (FUI), is a private university located in Islamabad, Pakistan. It has two campuses; Foundation University School of Health Sciences (FUSH) & Foundation University School of Science and Technology (FUSST).

Recognized university
Foundation University Islamabad is a recognized university by the Higher Education Commission of Pakistan.

Overview
FUI is a private sector university, sponsored by the Fauji Foundation which is the largest welfare organization in Pakistan. FUI was granted its charter by the Federal Government vide Ordinance No. LXXXVIII of 2002.

Faculties
 Faculty of Arts & Social Sciences
 Faculty of Business & Technology
 Faculty of Engineering and Information Technology

Programs Offered at Foundation University School of Science and Technology (FUSST)

The university offers following Undergraduate and Postgraduate degrees:

Undergraduate programs
 Bachelor of Science in Electrical Engineering
 Bachelor of Computer Software Engineering - Program Accredited from NCEAC
 Bachelor of  Science in Computer Science - Program Accreditation (NCEAC) Applied For
 Bachelor of Business Administration (honors) 
 Bachelor of Computer Arts
 Bachelor of  Science in Media and Communication
 Bachelor of Science in Psychology
 Bachelor of Science in English
 Bachelor of Science in Tourism and Hospitality

Masters programs
 MS Management Sciences
 MS Information Security
 MS Computer Sciences
 MS Engineering Management
 MS English (Linguistics & Literature)
 MS Media Sciences
 Master of Business Administration (MBA 3.5 years)
 Master of Business Administration (MBA 1.5 years)

M.Phil and Ph.D. programs
 PhD Computer Sciences
 PhD English
 PhD Management Sciences
 PhD Psychology

Foundation University College of Dentistry (FUCD) 
The student are educated in basic medical and dental sciences in the initial two years and are trained in different clinical specialties in third and final years including Oral and Maxillofacial Surgery, Operative/Restorative Dentistry, Prosthodontics, Periodontics and Orthodontics on simulated models (phantom heads) and as well as live clinical scenarios. FUCD offers the most modern and state of the art clinical facilities available in the country with services ranging from fillings and root canal treatments Dentures to Orthodontics Implants and Major surgeries of the jaws, mouth and face. It houses its own Central Sterilization and Supply Department (CSSD). Dean of the institution is Professor Dr Muhammad Azhar Sheikh, BDS, M.Sc. (Lond), FDS RCS (Eng) FDS RCS (Ire) and FDS Oral Surgery (UK) Where as Dr. Sidra Aamer and Dr. Nadia Amman are serving as Associate Dean (Basic Sciences) and Associate Dean (Clinical Sciences) of FUCD respectively. FUCD has two major Departments which includes Department of BASIC SCIENCES & Department of CLINICAL SCIENCES with their respective sub-departments.

Foundation University College of Physiotherapy  (FUCP) 

Foundation University College of Physiotherapy (FUCP) was established in 2014. It offers a 5-year Doctor of Physical Therapy (DPT) degree and follows the semester system. The intake of the department is 50 students per semester, with two semesters in a year. FUCP has a purpose-built campus with spacious lecture halls, amphitheaters, and multidisciplinary laboratories with facilities at par with international standards. It is also the first rehabilitation institute in Pakistan which took an initiative to offer paid house jobs to all graduates at the completion of their 5-year degree program.

Foundation University College of Nursing (FUCN) 
Fauji Foundation School of Nursing was established in 1979. It was running regular diploma courses and has now being upgraded to Foundation University College of Nursing (FUCN). FUCN will be a constituent college of Foundation University. It is under process of recognition by Pakistan Nursing Council (PNC) and will be affiliated with Nursing Examination Board Punjab.

Foundation University Sialkot Campus (FUSC) 
FUSC has been established in 2019, with an objective to provide quality and most relevant degree programs in the areas of Business, Information and Engineering Technologies, and also to launch technical courses to meet the industrial need for skilled manpower. The campus shall also provide opportunities to the skilled certificate and diploma holder workforce for their vertical mobility and career progression to acquire higher education. FUSC is providing Bachelors's level education in Engineering, IT and Management Sciences.

Fauji Foundation Hospital (FFH) 
The Fauji Foundation Hospital, Rawalpindi (A Teaching Hospital of FUMC) with the capacity of 750 beds is the flagship of Fauji Foundation Welfare Health Projects with an annual budget of about Rs. 2.4 billion.

Programs offered at Foundation University School of Health Sciences (FUSH)

 Bachelor of Medicine and Bachelor of Surgery (MBBS)
 Bachelor of Dental Surgery (BDS)
 Doctor of Physical Therapy (DPT)
Bachelor of Science Nursing

References

Fauji Foundation
Foundation University Islamabad
Educational institutions established in 2002
2002 establishments in Pakistan
Private universities and colleges in Pakistan
Islamabad Capital Territory